The 2014–15 Men's FIH Hockey World League was the second season of the men's field hockey national team league series. The tournament started in July 2014 in Sveti Ivan Zelina, Croatia and finished in December 2015 in Raipur, India.

The Semifinals of this competition also served as a qualifier for the 2016 Summer Olympics as the 6 highest placed teams apart from the host nation and the five continental champions qualified.

Australia won the tournament's Final round for the first time after defeating Belgium 2–1 in the final match. India won the third place match by defeating the Netherlands 3–2 on a penalty shootout after a 5–5 draw.

Qualification
Each national association member of the International Hockey Federation (FIH) had the opportunity to compete in the tournament, and after seeking entries to participate, 56 teams were announced to compete.

The 11 teams ranked between 1st and 11th in the FIH World Rankings current at early 2013 received an automatic bye to the Semifinals while the 8 teams ranked between 12th and 19th received an automatic bye to Round 2. Those nineteen teams, shown with qualifying rankings, were the following:

 (1)
 (2)
 (3)
 (4)
 (5)
 (6)
 (7)
 (8)
 (9)
 (10)
 (11)
 (12)
 (13)
 (14)
 (15)
 (16)
 (17)
 (18)
 (19)

Schedule

Round 1

Round 2

 – Fiji and Sri Lanka withdrew from participating and Oman and Ukraine took their place.

Semifinals

Final

Final ranking
FIH issued a final ranking to determine the world ranking. The final ranking was as follows:

References

Men's FIH Hockey World League
 
FIH Hockey World League
FIH Hockey World League